Huang Xianfan (November 13, 1899 – January 18, 1982) was a Zhuang Chinese historian, ethnologist and educator.

He was the first college graduate of Zhuang ethnicity and trained at Peking National University under leading historians and linguists in the 1920s. Huang was the first writer of a general history  of  the Zhuang nationality, but also a major advocate of the theory that there was no slavery  society in the history of the Zhuang, and there was no slave society as a stage of social development in Chinese history.

The General History of the Zhuang is the first research book on the history of Zhuang nationality and The "Bagui School" he created is the first school of ethnic studies in China.

Huang is considered one of the founders of modern Chinese ethnology.

Biography

Early life and education
Huang Xianfan was born on 13 November 1899 in the town of Qujiu in Fusui County, Guangxi province, Qing dynasty. His original name was Gan Jinying, and he was later renamed Huang Xianfan after the Huang family adopted him.

Huang's father, Gan Xinchang, was a Zhuang farmer and a stern disciplinarian according to Huang, who had a background in classics which allowed him to introduce Huang to various texts when Huang was six years old.

According to his autobiography, his intellectual gifts were recognized as a child by his uncle. Because of this, from an early age he was sent by his family to study the Confucian classics. Huang described his father as a stern disciplinarian. Huang's father sent the 9-year-old Huang to a traditional Chinese school where he studied Confucian classics, like Four Books and Five Classics, in order to pass the Imperial examination.

However, as a teenager he was dissatisfied by the scholastic system of his time, especially its emphasis on writing eight-legged essays. Huang later admitted that he didn't the Confucian classics, favouring instead history books such as Records of the Grand Historian. At the age of 14, Huang Xianfan was educated at Qusi Primary School. At 18, Huang moved to a higher primary school in nearby Quli, where he was bullied because of his peasant background.

In 1922, he entered Guangxi Third Normal college. In 1926, he entered Beijing Normal University and was taught by the famous tutors Chen Yuan and Qian Xuantong. It was there over nine years that he had completed his diploma, bachelor and postgraduate courses, writing a series of academic papers and books in classical Chinese on ancient history, Chinese society, politics, economy, culture, religion and folk customs, as well as translating the history of various countries into Chinese.

While studying at Beijing Normal University, Huang still taught language and history at a Beijing private high school. With his students, he set up Beilei Xueshe, an academic group and press in 1932, which published academic books.

Career
In November 1937 he returned to China to teach history as a professor in Guangxi, Sun Yat-sen University as well as in Guilin and Guangxi Normal University, and devoted himself to the study of Chinese anthropology and folklore. He was the first university professor of Zhuang nationality in China  and first university professor of Chongzuo city. During his academic career, he was assigned as a researcher in Guangxi Educational Institute, he was a dean of the Chinese department, and a curator in Guangxi University. He also worked as a director of the library in Guangxi Normal University.

When the People's Republic of China was founded in 1949, Professor Huang Xianfan was elected as a director of the Chinese People's Association for Friendship with Foreign Countries in its first congress. He was then the only representative from Guangxi cultural and educational circles. After 1954, he was elected as a representative of the first National People's Congress, a committeeman of Ethnic Affairs Committee of NPC, and a committeeman of International Culture Liaison Committee of CPC. Meanwhile, he had also been elected as a committeeman of the People's Government of Guixi Zhuang Nationnality Autonomous Region and the committeeman of the Council of Guangxi province.

During the “Hundred Flowers Campaign” thaw of 1956–57, he opposed the Communist Party's education policy. But then the climate suddenly changed with the “Anti-Rightist Movement". In 1957, Huang stood with head bowed before countless assemblies to confess his "crimes toward the people". Hundreds of articles attacked him, not a few by colleagues, some viciously dishonest. On 1 February 1958, a resolution was made in the fifth session of the first National People's Congress, that Mr.Fei Xiaotong, Huang Xianfan and Ou Bai Chuan were removed from their memberships of the Ethnic Committee of NPC. He was wrongly classified as among "five rightist historians" (Huang Xianfan, Xiang Da, Lei Haizong, Wang Zhongmin, Chen Mengjia), and became one of biggest "rightists" in Chinese history circles. After the outbreak of the Cultural Revolution, he was abused and physically attacked by Red Guards, forced to clean toilets. Huang became an outcast, humiliated, isolated, academic research unable to publish.

In 1979, the Chinese government has corrected all the wrong identities of the so-called bourgeois rightists. Professor Huang Xianfan was then posted as a counselor of Chinese Ethnic Association, an ethnic editor for the Encyclopedia of China (Zhōngguó Dà Bǎikē Quánshū), a counselor of Institute for Studies on Chinese Southwest Minorities, and a vice-chairman of institute for studies on Chinese Baiyue Ethnic History. Later on he was elected as a committee member of the fifth congress of CCPPCC, and during this period, he had assisted Chinese government with a lot of corrections for the wrong political cases.

During his lifetime, Huang Xianfan had worked in many universities and taught a lot of students. In his later years, he had founded Li Jiang Sparetime college, and worked as the head of this college. In November 1999, Guangxi Normal University had held a grand forum on professor Huang Xianfan's hundred years birthday. After the forum, the university edited and published two books——The thesis on the memory of professor Huang Xianfan's hundred years birthday and the introduction on Chinese ancient books—written by professor Huang Xianfan. Now Guangxi Normal University and Guilin high school have established their scholarships in memory of professor Huang Xianfan.

Family
Huang had two wives: Lanmei and Liu Lihua. They brought eleven children to Huang; all of them became successful individuals through Huang's strict and effective education. Two of them were professors at Chinese universities, including Huang Xiaoling, a prominent professor of medicine of Guangxi.

Academic research activities

During the War with Japan
Huang Xianfan formed a group to do ethnographic research in the border region of Guizhou-Guangxi in August 1943, and worked as the head of this group. Again, in April 1945, as a leader he formed another investigative group to research South Guizhou border dwellers. They conducted a lot of academic research in ethnic areas of Guizhou and Guangxi. By doing this, Huang became a pioneer of ethnic residence investigations.

During period of Guangxi University
In June 1951, Huang Xianfan joined a central government ethnic mission led by Fei Xiaotong(Huang was vice leader and in Guangxi sub-group of the middlesouth delegation). They went to Guangxi ethnic areas for condolences and investigations. In March 1952, he went with his students to areas of Duan, Donglan and Nandan for investigation. In the summer of this year, they went to Chongzuo, Debao, Jingxi and Longluo of Fusui for field investigation. They had collected a lot of historical relics from local headmen, which including materials of Nong Zhigao's uprising and the anti-qing dynasty movement led by Wu Lingyun and his son. In June 1953, Huang formed a historical relics investigation group from the cultural education bureau of the People's Government of Guixi Zhuang Nationality Autonomous Region in Guangxi University. As a leader, he led the group members to Nandan, Tiane, Hechi, Luocheng and Yicheng, They visited and investigated Yao, Maonan, Miao, Zhuang and Mulao minorities, and collected many historical relics and materials.

During period of Guangxi Normal University

In March 1954, Huang went to Gui county to make a field investigation and collect Zhuang ethnic's living condition and historical and revolutionary materials of Huang Dingfeng and Taiping rebellions that took place in Gui County.

On 19 April 1954, under the instruction of Peng Zhen, a resolution was made at the March 31 conference, the Ethnic Committee of NPC made a document of primary scheme of investigation and research work on Chinese ethnics social and historical conditions in minorities areas. They decided to form several groups to investigate Chinese ethnics social and historical conditions, Yunnan group was led by Fei Xiaotong, Liu Guanying, joined by Fang Guoyu. Sichuan group led by Xia Kongnong, joined by Yang Xing and Hu Qingjun. North-west group led by Feng Jiasheng, joined by Chen Yongling.Guizhou group led by Wu ZeLing, joined by Liang Oudi. Guangdong and Hai Nan group led by Chen Jiawu. Guangxi group led by Huang Xianfan, Mo Qing. Xinjiang group led by Xinjiang working committee, joined by Li Youyi and Li Youzhai. Nei Meng and North-east group led by Qiu Pu and Weng Dujian. In the same year of August professor Huang took part in forming a group of investigation on Guangxi ethnics social history. He was vice group leader and head of Zhuang ethnic group, responsible for the whole group's academic investigation work. He led the group making a largest and deepest investigation on ethnic history and traditional culture in Guangxi history. They had collected a lot of valuable materials and laid a foundation for further research on Zhuang ethnic social and historical culture. That was a very important beginning for later development of Zhuang ethnic research and establishment of Guangxi institute of ethnic studies. During three periods of ethnic identification work after 1949, Fei Xiaotong, Huang Xianfan, Xia Kangnong and a lot of academic masters and scholars from anthropology and ethnic study circles had made their great contributions. It was upon this research work of national ethnic identification that the State Council could be able to announce there are 56 ethnics in China. This was also a pioneering contribution to Chinese ethnic studies. In the meantime, the world ethnic study circles had noticed this and gave very high comments. This was the reason that ethnic study circles called professor Huang a founder of modern Chinese ethnology.

In July 1978, Huang formed a field investigation team and went to Nongzhou, Pingxiang, Ningming and Congzuo district. They collected a lot of valuable historical materials and studied the mountain frescos of Ningming in situ.

In November 1979, Huang led a field investigation team to Baise, Tianyang, Tiandong and Bama districts to investigate and collect historical materials.

In March 1981, he went to Sichuan to attend the first national seminar on cliff coffin and made academic investigation and collect historical materials there.

Academic ideas

Historical Notion
Huang Xianfan had always emphasized "the importance of independent academic research", and take pioneering studies, academic freedom as his lifelong aspirations. His academic principle was "keep honest and not obedient to the authorities". He believed that the motto of academic research was "no authorities, no ends, no prohibitions". Professor Chen Jisheng pointed out: "The connotation of Professor Huang's academic theory was to connect traditional Chinese history studies with western new history theory in order to complement his favorite Puxue of Qing dynasty, Gu Yanwu's historiography thought with modern American Robinson's "New History". Professor Huang had made a great academic contribution to the New History's Practice and Construction in China. His academic works are characterised in connecting western theory of evolution with traditional Chinese theory of Seeking Truth and The Past Serve the Present". Professor Huang's lifelong pursuit of academic research was Dialectical unity of historical philosophy and historical science.  Huang was consistently critical of works of Chinese general history that were published in the 20th century. He pointed out that those works were lacking descriptions of Chinese ethnicity, as if China's general history is the same as Han's general history. He was fighting the perception that China is only the equivalent of Han. He believed the riddance of the feudal concept ofchauvinism. He publicly opposed dogmatizing, formulizing and regulating Marxism.  In 1957, Huang advocated a theory of "lacking of slave society", later on, in 1979 he brought forward a famous academic view: "no slave society in Chinese history". His theory was warmly agreed by most scholars from history circles. They called him "leader of Wunu school".

Ethnic Notion
Huang Xianfan had consistently argued against ethnic chauvinism. He believed that crux of the ethnic problems was caused by ethnical inequity, which had a major influence on ethnical conflicts in history. Professor Huang advocated the equality of each ethnic of the world and a "spiritual civilization with scientific attitude" on ethnic studies. By active practice, he became a forerunner of Zhuang studies in the 20th century. People therefore called him the "father of Zhuang studies". Based on this, he formed a Huang group of Zhuang studies and the famous Bagui School in Chinese history. The Huang group is a pioneering branch of the Chinese Bagui School of ethnology. It was formed in the 1950s and remains active. The Huang group members include Huang Xianfan and his 18 students, commonly referred to as the Huang Xianfan's 18 elite disciples. His students are professors or researchers work in Guangxi Zhuang Autonomous Region, most of whom work in the Guangxi Normal University and Guangxi University for Nationalities. This is an academic group from the Zhuang and Han scholars in combination. Zhuang scholars are Huang Xianfan, Huang Zengqing, Zhang Yiming, Li Guozhu, Su Guanchang, Li Ganfen, Zhou Zongxian, Qin Suguan, Zhou Zuoqiou, Huang Shaoqing, Huang Weicheng, He Yingde, He Longqun, Yu Shijie, Gong Yonghuei, Qin Deqing and Han scholars are Ou Yang Ruoxiou, Xiao Zechang, Zhou Zuoming in this group. The group members focus on the study of history, archeology, culture, folklore, education, literature, historical figures, Dulao system and Chieftain system of the Zhuang. As the all members of this group can speak minority languages, therefore, this group attaches great importance to the field survey. This is the significant academic characteristic of this group.

The Bagui School is an academic group of ethnologists that gathered around Huang Xianfan. It emerged as a school at the Guangxi Normal University in China when Huang Xianfan became a committeeman of Ethnic Affairs Committee of NPC and head of group of investigation on Guangxi ethnics social history in the mid-1950s. It is active in the Chinese ethnology during the second half of the 20th century and up to present. The Bagui School is the first ethnic school in China. It was particularly dominated by professor Huang Xianfan. Many of its members were Zhuang people who loved and cared about their nationality. Members of the school were all scholars who researched the culture and history of Zhuang nationality in Guangxi, they are all from different universities and ethnic research institutes. As consistently opposed to the ethnical chauvinism, it builds its research on an entirely unconventional framework, which is advocated the equality of each ethnic of China and a'spiritual civilization with scientific attitude' on ethnic studies. Members of the school had a common attitude towards Zhuang nationality. Today, the Bagui school of China continues as a school of Ethnology, have spawned several branch schools which also researched the history of Zhuang nationality.

For this reason, Huang Xianfan was also honored by ethnic academic circles as a leader of Bagui School. People call Huang Xianfan's family a family of educators, for Mr. and Mrs. Huang and most of their children are teaching in schools or universities.

Academic style 
Professor Huang Xianfan's academic style had three characteristics: 1. Pioneering study on history, 2. Multi-evidence method 3. New textual research method. Based on Wang Guowei's dual evidence method, Professor Huang had founded his own unique "tri-evidence method", which is a new academic research method that combines archeological materials(physical goods and character), historical documents, ethnological materials (historical remains and oral historical materials) in his textual research on ancient Chinese history and culture.

Major works
Outline of Chinese History. Beijing: Beiping Culture Society, 1932, 1934.
Foreign history of high school. Beijing: Beiping Lida Bookstore, 1933.
Brief Introduction on Tang Dynasty. Shanghai: Commercial Press, 1936. 1937 (Reprint 2009 (Jilin Publishing Group Reprint).
Save Nation Movement of Tai-Xue students in Song Dynasty. Shanghai: Commercial Press, 1936, 1956, 1965 (Taipei: Wenxing Bookstore Reprint), 1996 (Shanghai: Shanghai Bookstore Reprint), 2000 (Jilin Publishing Group Reprint).
Speech of Chinese History. Nanning: Guangxi University, 1938.
Chinese social history in Yin Dynasty. Nanning: Guangxi University, 1950.
History of China's feudal society. Nanning: Guangxi University, 1952.
Selected Readings in Chinese history books. Guilin: Guangxi Normal University, 1953.
Zhuang history of resistance to oppression. Nanning: Guangxi social and historical investigation team, 1957.
Brief History of the Zhuang. Nanning: Guangxi Peoples's Press, 1957.
Establishment of the Soviet regime in Youjiang. Guilin: Guangxi Normal University, 1957.
Survey of the Guangxi Daxin County Zhuang. Nanning: Guangxi social and historical investigation team, 1957.
On the social and historical survey of Guangxi Zhuang. Nanning: Guangxi, social and historical investigation team, 1957.
Introduction to classical writings read. Guilin: Guangxi Normal University, 1962.
Formation of the Han. Guilin: Guangxi Normal University, 1976.
No Slave Society in Chinese History. Guilin: Guangxi Normal University Press, 1981.
Nong Zhigao. Nanning: Guangxi Peoples's Press, 1983, 
General History of the Zhuang. Nanning: Guangxi National Press, 1988. /K·13
Introduction on Chinese Ancient Books. Guilin: Guangxi Normal University Press, 2004. 
A Critical Biography of Wei Baqun. Guilin: Guangxi Normal University Press, 2008.

Major Articles
The following are the Articles written by Huang Xianfan.

Data source: Huang Xianfan. Introduction on Chinese Ancient Books. Guilin: Guangxi Normal University Press, 2004.p. 560-567(works and articles catalog).

References

Sources 
Dictionary of Modern Chinese Names. Tokyo: Japanese Kazankai Foundation, 1966, 1972, 1982 and 1986 edition.
ZHONG GUO REN MING DA CI DIAN. Shanghai: Shanghai Lexicographical Press, 1992.p. 1861.
Chinese Dictionary of Contemporary Culture Celebrities. Beijing: Chinese Radio Television Press, 1992. p. 519.
Dictionary of Chinese Education. Shanghai: Shanghai Education Press, 1998. p. 1450.
Dictionary of Chinese Ethnic Culture. Beijing: Ethnic Press, 1999. p. 143-144, Volumes of middlesouth and southeast region.

1899 births
1982 deaths
Chinese anthropologists
Delegates to the 1st National People's Congress
Members of the 5th Chinese People's Political Consultative Conference
People from Chongzuo
People's Republic of China historians
Chinese folklorists
Zhuang people
Republic of China historians
Historians from Guangxi
Educators from Guangxi
Academic staff of Guangxi University
Academic staff of Sun Yat-sen University
Academic staff of Guangxi Normal University
Victims of the Anti-Rightist Campaign
Victims of the Cultural Revolution
Chinese Peasants' and Workers' Democratic Party politicians
People's Republic of China politicians from Guangxi
Scientists from Guangxi
20th-century Chinese historians
Beijing Normal University alumni
University of Tokyo alumni
Chinese sinologists
20th-century anthropologists